Betania is coastal village in Western Madagascar south of Morondava with a population of around 2400 Vezo fishermen.

Notes

References

Populated places in Atsimo-Andrefana